The 1976 North Carolina gubernatorial election was held on November 2, 1976. Democratic nominee Jim Hunt defeated Republican nominee David T. Flaherty with 64.99% of the vote.

, this marks the last occasion that the following counties have voted Democratic in a gubernatorial election: Caldwell, Clay, Davidson, Randolph, and Wilkes.

Primary elections
Primary elections were held on August 17, 1976.

Democratic primary

Candidates
 Jim Hunt, incumbent Lieutenant Governor
 Edward O'Herron Jr., chairman of Eckerd Drugs and former member of the North Carolina House of Representatives
 George Wood, former member of the North Carolina Senate
 Thomas Strickland, incumbent member of the North Carolina Senate
 Andy Barker, incumbent Mayor of Love Valley, North Carolina

Results

Republican primary

Candidates
David Flaherty, former State Senator
Coy Privette, Baptist pastor
Jacob F. Alexander, former North Carolina Secretary of Transportation 
Wallace McCall

Results

General election

Candidates
Major party candidates
Jim Hunt, Democratic
David T. Flaherty, Republican

Other candidates
Herbert F. Seawell Jr., American
Arlan K. Andrews, Libertarian

Results

References

1976
North Carolina
Gubernatorial